Diamond Trust Bank Group, in short DTB Group, is an African banking group active in Burundi, Kenya, Tanzania, and Uganda. The flagship company of the group, Diamond Trust Bank Kenya, is licensed by the Central Bank of Kenya, the central bank and national banking regulator in Kenya, the largest economy in the East African Community.

Location
DTB Group's main offices are located at Diamond Trust Bank Centre (DTBC), along Mombasa Road in Nairobi, Kenya.

Overview
The flagship of DTB Group is Diamond Trust Bank (Kenya), which was founded in 1946. , the group is ranked the eighth largest commercial bank, by assets, out of 43 licensed banks in Kenya. At that time, the group's total assets were approximately US$1.924 billion (KES:166.52 billion), with shareholders' equity of about US$242.1 million (KES:20.95 billion). As of 2018, it ranked 5th.

The group works in collaboration with the Habib Bank of the Aga Khan Fund for Economic Development and the International Finance Corporation of the World Bank. In July 2017, the Diamond Trust Bank Group acquired 100% ownership of the former "Habib Bank Kenya". The new acquisition merged with Diamond Trust Bank Kenya, effective 1 August 2017. As part of the new acquisition, DTB Group has agreed to retain 41 former Habib Bank employees.

Member companies
DTB Group includes the following companies:

Subsidiaries 
Diamond Trust Bank (Kenya) Limited - Retail banking - Nairobi, Kenya  100% Shareholding - A commercial bank in Kenya, serving individuals and businesses. This is the flagship company of the group, accounting for 6.4% of banking assets in Kenya, as at December 2016.
Diamond Trust Bank (Uganda) Limited - Retail banking - Kampala, Uganda  54.1% Shareholding - A commercial bank in Uganda, serving both individuals and businesses.
Diamond Trust Bank (Tanzania) Limited - Retail banking - Dar es Salaam, Tanzania  62.9% Shareholding - A commercial bank in Tanzania, serving both individuals and businesses.
Diamond Trust Bank (Burundi) Limited - Retail banking - Bujumbura, Burundi  67.3% Shareholding - A commercial bank in Bujumbura, serving individuals and businesses.
Diamond Trust Insurance Agency Limited - Bancassurance - Nairobi, Kenya  100% Shareholding - This unit offers Bancassurance services.  
Diamond Trust Bank (Rwanda) Limited - Retail banking - Kigali, Rwanda  - In development.
Premier Savings and Finance Limited - Dormant - Nairobi, Kenya  100% Shareholding.

Associates companies to the group 
 Jubilee Insurance Company of Burundi - Insurance - Bujumbura, Burundi - 20% Shareholding - An insurance company in Burundi. A member of Jubilee Insurance Company Limited. Jubilee Insurance which shares a common shareholder with Diamond Trust Bank (i.e. AKFED) holds 80 percent of the venture.
 Services and Systems Limited - Dormant]] - Nairobi, Kenya - 40 percent Shareholding.

Ownership
The shares of the Diamond Trust Bank Group are listed on the Nairobi Stock Exchange. , the major shareholders in the Group's stock, are depicted in the table below:

Criminal Summons In Uganda 
In September 2021, DTB Group Top Management including the Aga Khan, Nasim Devji Mohamed,the group Chief Executive Officer, Varghese Thambi the DTB Uganda Managing Director  and John Sitakange the head of credit for DTB Uganda were summoned in Uganda by the Buganda Road Magistrates Court to retort charges of theft, electronic fraud, making fabricated entries in financial ledgers, computer misuse, emitting false documents and conspiracy to commit crime in contravention of;  section 254 of the Penal Code Act Cap 120, section 47 (1) and (3) of the financial Institutions Act of 2004, section 19 of the computer misuse Act, section 351 of the Penal Code Act 120 and section 360 of Penal Code Act 120 of the Constitution of Uganda following the Bank's Conviction of fraud by the High Court in Uganda in a civil suite 43 of 2020 filed by Hamis Kiggundu after the bank had defrauded over $30Million from his bank accounts.

Branch network
 DTB Group maintains a total of nearly 100 branches in the East African countries where it operates. In May 2012, Kenyan press reports indicated that the group planned expansion into Rwanda, the Democratic Republic of the Congo, Mozambique and South Sudan by 2020.

See also
 List of banks in Kenya

References

External links
 Diamond Trust Bank Tanzania Records US$7.5 Million Pre-Tax Profit
 Diamond Trust Bank Kenya official site
 Diamond Trust Bank Uganda official site
 Diamond Trust Bank Group Posts Strong Growth
 DTB Group Plans Regional Expansion

Banks of Kenya
Aga Khan Development Network
Companies based in Nairobi
Banks established in 1946
Kenyan companies established in 1946